Eastfield is a primarily residential district on the north eastern outskirts of Edinburgh, the capital of Scotland. It lies between Joppa and the Edinburgh City boundary with Musselburgh. The district is bounded on the north by the Firth of Forth, on the west by Joppa and the main East Coast rail line, and on the south by farmland and the grounds of Newhailes House, a National Trust for Scotland property. The western boundary leads into Musselburgh along the coast, passing the small harbour at Fisherrow. In addition to housing, Eastfield includes Portobello Cemetery and a private five-hole golf course behind the houses on the south side of Milton Road.

Notable buildings

Jewel and Esk College
Milton House (now Kings Manor Hotel)
Queens Bay Lodge

Portobello Cemetery
The cemetery (including the lodge and gates) was designed by Robert Paterson in 1877.

The cemetery lies on Milton Road East in Eastfield. The southern section holds a large Muslim graveyard. Notable interments include:

 William Durham FRSE (1834–1893), chemist and astronomer
 John Proudfoot Goodsir (1864–1952), architect
 Alexander Kirkwood engraver, the "son" of Alexander Kirkwood & Son
 Ivison Macadam
 Stevenson Macadam
 William Ivison Macadam
 Reginald William Mapleton, eminent surgeon, son of Dean Reginald Mapleton
 Sir Edward Moss (1852–1912), theatre impresario

Sources

(Google Maps)
(Wikimapia)

Areas of Edinburgh